CO1 may refer to:

CO postcode area 
Conway group Co1 in mathematics
Carbon monoxide in chemistry
Cytochrome Oxidase Subunit 1
Min'an Electric CO1, a vehicle made by Min'an Electric